This is a discography for the Swedish melodic death metal band Amon Amarth. The band is from Stockholm and was founded in 1992. Their lyrics mostly deal with the Vikings, their mythology and their history.  The band comprises vocalist Johan Hegg, guitarists Olavi Mikkonen and Johan Söderberg, bassist Ted Lundström, and drummer Jocke Wallgren. Amon Amarth has released twelve studio albums, one compilation album, one EP, one video album, and twenty two music videos.

Albums

Studio albums

Compilation albums

Video albums

EPs

Music videos

Demos

Demo 1 
Demo 1 is a demo self-released in 1991/1992. It is extremely rare and only a few copies exist. The demo was released under the band's first name, Scum, as a grindcore band.

Track listing

Credits
 Puppe M. – vocals
 Olli M. − lead guitar
 Vesa M. − rhythm guitar
 Petri T. − bass
 Niko K. − drums

Thor Arise 
Thor Arise is a demo recorded in 1993. The album was never initially released due to its low production standards. The album features "Sabbath Bloody Sabbath", a cover of the Black Sabbath song. The song "Thor Arise" was re-recorded as a bonus track on the digipak version of The Avenger. "Risen from the Sea" was re-recorded on The Crusher. The entire album was re-released with the "Viking Edition" of Versus the World.

Track listing

Credits
 Johan Hegg − vocals
 Olavi Mikkonen − lead guitar
 Anders Hansson − rhythm guitar
 Ted Lundström − bass
 Niko Kaukinen − drums

The Arrival of the Fimbul Winter 
The Arrival of the Fimbul Winter is a demo self-released in 1994. Its original release was limited and consisted of 1000 copies. The demo was released on three different colour tapes with different styles. The "labels" for the demo are not professionally made, and were created by the band for the release of the demo. Both "Burning Creation" and "The Arrival of the Fimbul Winter" were re-released on Sorrow Throughout the Nine Worlds, "Without Fear" was re-released on Once Sent from the Golden Hall.

Track listing

Credits
 Johan Hegg − vocals
 Olavi Mikkonen − lead guitar
 Anders Hansson − rhythm guitar
 Ted Lundström − bass
 Niko Kaukinen − drums

References 

Heavy metal group discographies
Discographies of Swedish artists